The Antarctic springtail, Cryptopygus antarcticus, is a species of springtail native to Antarctica  and Australia. Like other springtails, the Antarctic springtail too has been found to be useful as a bioindicator of pollution and has been used to study microplastic pollution in Antarctica. They also tend aggregate, by signaling to other individuals via pheromones, specially when temperatures are low, to avoid a high water loss rate.

References

Collembola
Animals described in 1901
Fauna of Heard Island and McDonald Islands